The Sandman: Overture is a graphic novel written by Neil Gaiman with art by J.H. Williams III. It is a prequel to Gaiman's The Sandman series, and debuted in 2013, about 17 years after the end of the regular comic. It was originally published as six issues with two-month intervals in between. A deluxe edition combining all six issues was published in November 2015.

Plot
On an alien world, an aspect of Dream senses that something is very wrong, and dies in flames. In London 1915, while intending to deal with the troublesome nightmare The Corinthian, Morpheus is alerted to the same wrongness and is summoned to an alien world to investigate.

A meeting is held on a distant planet. Aspects of Dream from various sentient species are present and have been awaiting his arrival to investigate. After consulting the oldest Aspect of Dream and another figure known as "Glory of the First Circle" he learns that the cause of the wrongness is the insanity of a star which will spread until the universe itself is destroyed. Glory claims that Dream is at fault for the insanity.

Realizing that the source of the madness was his mishandling of a past Vortex, he embarks on a journey accompanied by a cat that seems to be another aspect of Dream. Over the course of their journey, they meet the three fates and an orphaned alien girl named Hope. After telling a story to pass the night, he confirms that his mission isn't to save the universe, as he has accepted it's too late for that. Instead, they journey to the domain of his father Time who refuses his request for aid, saying that he has already given him too much. As he leaves, he asks his father bitterly if he has spoken to his mother Night recently. Emerging out of his father's domain, he appears at the gate of the "City of Stars" and is granted entrance after a heated exchange with other stars. Entering the prison of the mad star, he tells the story of how his refusal to kill a vortex led to the madness spreading to an entire solar system. After having destroyed the entire planet, he spared the sun, reasoning that he had done enough killing on that day. Finishing his tale, he attempts to destroy the mad star but fails.

The other stars reveal that the madness has spread to infect them and they will kill the child. Before he can protect her, his father summons him back to his domain and asks if he could put him in contact with his mother. He returns to find the stars have killed Hope, and they toss Dream into a black hole. Inside the black hole, Dream visits Night's domain. After he mentions his father Time's wish to visit her she refuses and offers to create a personal Dreamworld where he may be happy. After that offer is rejected he is thrown out of the dimension as his mother remarks that he has been very selfish.

He is summoned to Destiny's domain after a short while in the black hole. A mysterious ship belonging to Dream has appeared in his garden, and the cat aspect of Dream has been meeting with members of various species from the surrounding galactic war and housing them in the ship. The cat reminds Dream that he reflects reality and that the universe can be saved. Journeying into the realm of his sister Delirium, he learns that the cat was actually Desire in disguise. Returning, he instructs Hope (who had been rescued by Desire from the afterlife) to have the inhabitants of the ship dream of a changed reality, while he guides the ship towards that reality. He succeeds and arrives at the original meeting place, where Glory congratulates him on his success. Weakened by his effort, he begins his journey home but is captured, setting up the events of the original series.

In the epilogue, Desire reveals to Despair that the successful rescue of the universe was the result of Desire's third attempt to assist Dream. The first two attempts were thwarted by Dream's refusal to accept help, and Desire was able to start over by using Father Time's saeculum, symbolized in the story by a warped timepiece hidden in Mad Hettie's memories.

Recognition
The Sandman: Overture was awarded the 2016 Hugo Award for Best Graphic Story. The win was controversial because the protest group Sad Puppies supported its nomination. Gaiman called their involvement "disappointing" and the reaction to them an "unfortunate mess" in his acceptance speech, but said that withdrawing from consideration would have given the Sad Puppies "too much acknowledgment". It received critical praise from IGN.

References

2013 comics debuts
The Sandman (comic book)
Hugo Award for Best Graphic Story-winning works
Gothic comics